Fredrikstad Ballklubb (also known as Fredrikstad Bkl.) is a handball club from Fredrikstad, Viken county, Norway. The women's team currently competes in Eliteserien, the top division since its promotion in 2017.

Team

Current squad
Squad for the 2022-23 season

Goalkeeper
 1  Caroline Martins
 12  Hanne Ramsøskar Sagvold
 16  Marte Bentdal Pettersen
Wingers
LW
 11  Hanna Blystad
 14  Tuva Lande Thulin 
 25  Andrea Varvin Fredriksen
 28  Leah Berg Pejby
RW
 3  Hedda Lauvås Aasen
 37  Sigrid Nyland Grønvik
Line players
 7  Alexandra Lìf Arnarsdòttir
 26  Selma Helén Henriksen
 72  Martine Guterud Helland

Back players
 2  Zara Johnsson Solberg
 4  Marthe Eline Kraft Johannessen
 5  Ingeborg Furunes
 6  Benedicte Frøland Nesdal
 13  Karoline Elise Syversen
 18  Julie Hulleberg
 22  Sara Eline Lauritzen
 26  Frida Brandbu Andersen
 32  Runa Heimsjø Sand
 36  Harrieth Toft Nordrum

2023-24 transfers

Joining

Leaving
 Candy Jabateh (RW) (to  Paris 92) with immediate effect
 Runa Heimsjø Sand (LB) (to  Molde HK)

Technical staff
 Head coach: Elias Mar Haldorsson
 Assistant coach: Gjøril Anett Johnsson Solberg

Notable former National Team players
 Berglind Íris Hansdóttir
 Anette Hovind Johansen
 Kari Brattset (2011–2014)
 Thale Rushfeldt Deila

Notable former club players

 Hanne Frandsen
 Pernille Huldgaard Christensen
 Melanie Felber
 Gabriella Juhász
 Emilie Wernersen
 Martine Hovden
 Katharina Steinsvik Olsen
 Kine Kristiansen
 Linn Mangset
 Kamilla Røed Érsek
 Thea Emilie Berg
 Lisa Forsberg Bernhardsen
 Malene Staal
 Marianne Storkås
 Tina Bjerke
 Anett Andersen
 Cristina Pozo Helmersen
 Ida Marie Wernersen
 Martine Moen (2017–2019)
 Dorthe Groa
 Anette Helene Hansen
 Nora Lande Thulin
 Hedda Lande Thulin
 Live Rushfeldt Deila
 Thea Øby-Olsen
 Ida Marie Kallhovd
 Maja Muri
 Andrea Rønning
 Candy Jabateh
 Karin Carlsson
 Linnea Arrhenius
 Louise Karlsson (2016–2019)
 Jenny Caroline Sandgren

References

External links
 Official website
 Official Topphåndball website

Norwegian handball clubs
Handball clubs established in 2001
Sport in Viken
2001 establishments in Norway
Sport in Fredrikstad